Hiidenniemi beacon tower was a historic daymark tower on the northern coast of Hailuoto island in Gulf of Bothnia in Finland. The structure was located at the northernmost point of the island, a minor promontory named Hiidenniemi.

The structure was built in 1859 from the plans drawn by Ernst Lohrmann. It was a wooden hexagonal (six-sided) tower. The tower had a topmarker, which was either a weather vane or a simple flag. The structure was later destroyed by fire and never rebuilt.

Sources
 

Towers completed in 1859
Towers in Finland
Gulf of Bothnia
Hailuoto
Beacon towers
Landmarks in Finland
Buildings and structures in North Ostrobothnia
Daymarks